John Thomas Coppinger (born March 19, 1974) was a former pitcher in Major League Baseball who played from  through  for the Baltimore Orioles and Milwaukee Brewers. He attended high school at Coronado High School in El Paso, Texas and graduated in 1993. He is also known for surrendering Mark McGwire's 583rd home run, which was the last home run of McGwire's career.

Coppinger was traded from the Orioles to the Brewers on July 16, 1999, in a transaction that was completed five days later on July 21 when Al Reyes was sent to Baltimore.

References

External links
, or Retrosheet, or The Baseball Gauge
Venezuela Winter League

1974 births
Living people
Baltimore Orioles players
Baseball players from Texas
Bluefield Orioles players
Bowie Baysox players
El Paso Diablos players
Frederick Keys players
Gulf Coast Orioles players
Huntsville Stars players
Indianapolis Indians players
Leones del Caracas players
American expatriate baseball players in Venezuela
Major League Baseball pitchers
Milwaukee Brewers players
Modesto A's players
Rochester Red Wings players
Sacramento River Cats players
Sportspeople from El Paso, Texas